Manassah Daniel Jatau (born 29 December 1955 in Balanga, Nigeria) is the deputy governor of Gombe state. He was elected Deputy Governor alongside Governor Muhammad Inuwa Yahaya during the 2019 general elections of Nigeria.

See also 

 Gombe State

References

Living people
1955 births
People from Gombe State
Nigerian politicians